Tomas Barraza (20 December 1907 – 21 March 1948) was a Chilean fencer. He competed in the individual and team épée and team sabre events at the 1936 Summer Olympics.

References

External links
 

1907 births
1948 deaths
Chilean male épée fencers
Olympic fencers of Chile
Fencers at the 1936 Summer Olympics
Chilean male sabre fencers
People from Chiloé Province
20th-century Chilean people